Janet Rock is a small rock  west-northwest of Liotard Glacier, lying immediately seaward of the ice cliffs overlying the coast of Antarctica. It was photographed from the air by U.S. Navy Operation Highjump, 1946–47, was charted by the French Antarctic Expedition, 1952–53, and named by them for Paul Janet, a French spiritualist-philosopher of the 19th century.

References

Rock formations of Adélie Land